Moumi Nicolas Brice Ngamaleu (born 9 July 1994) is a Cameroonian professional footballer who plays as a right winger for Russian Premier League club Dynamo Moscow and the Cameroon national team.

Club career
Ngamaleu was still only 17 when he made his Elite One debut with Coton Sport FC de Garoua. He won three domestic titles in his home land before moving to Austria in 2016. He helped Rheindorf Altach finish fourth in the Austrian league.

He was part of the Young Boys squad that won the 2017–18 Swiss Super League, their first league title for 32 years.

On 8 September 2022, Ngamaleu signed with Dynamo Moscow in Russia for two seasons, with an option to extend.

International career
Ngamaleu made his debut with the Cameroon national team against Guinea on 28 March 2017. He was included in the Cameroon squad for the 2017 Confederations Cup in Russia.

He placed third with Cameroon at the 2021 Africa Cup of Nations, where he supplied two assists and converted one penalty in the penalty shoot-out against Burkina Faso in the third-place playoff. He started in six out of seven matches and played one half in the last game.

Career statistics

Club

International goals
Scores and results list Cameroon's goal tally first, score column indicates score after each Ngamaleu goal.

Honours
Coton Sport
 Elite One: 2013, 2014, 2015

Young Boys
 Swiss Super League: 2017–18, 2018–19, 2019–20
 Swiss Cup: 2019–20

International
Cameroon
Africa Cup of Nations Bronze: 2021
Individual
Swiss Super League Team of the Year: 2019–20

References

1994 births
Living people
Cameroonian footballers
Footballers from Yaoundé
Association football midfielders
Cameroon international footballers
2017 FIFA Confederations Cup players
Coton Sport FC de Garoua players
SC Rheindorf Altach players
BSC Young Boys players
FC Dynamo Moscow players
Austrian Football Bundesliga players
Swiss Super League players
Russian Premier League players
Cameroonian expatriate footballers
Cameroonian expatriate sportspeople in Austria
Expatriate footballers in Austria
Cameroonian expatriate sportspeople in Switzerland
Expatriate footballers in Switzerland
Cameroonian expatriate sportspeople in Russia
Expatriate footballers in Russia
2021 Africa Cup of Nations players
2016 African Nations Championship players
Cameroon A' international footballers
2022 FIFA World Cup players